Andrey Arhiptsaw (born 5 July 1984) is a Belarusian professional footballer who plays for Leskhoz Gomel.

External links

1984 births
Living people
Belarusian footballers
Association football midfielders
FC Gomel players
FC ZLiN Gomel players
FC Rechitsa-2014 players
FC Smorgon players
FC Slavia Mozyr players
FC DSK Gomel players
FC Khimik Svetlogorsk players
FC Lokomotiv Gomel players
FC Sputnik Rechitsa players